Nicholas or Nick Harrison may refer to:
Nicholas Harrison (physicist) (born 1964), English theoretical physicist
Nicholas Harrison (athlete) (born 1970), Australian long-distance runner
Nick Harrison (cricketer) (born 1992), English cricketer
Nick Harrison (racing) (1982–2019), American stock car racing crew chief
Nick Harrison (Shortland Street),  a character on Shortland Street
Nicky Harrison, strings arranger for The Rolling Stones' album Goats Head Soup